Marius Kimutai (born 10 December 1992) is a Kenyan-born Bahraini long-distance runner.

Career 

In 2015, he won the Dalian International Marathon in Dalian, China with a time of 2:15:18.

In 2017, he won the Rotterdam Marathon in Rotterdam, Netherlands with a time of 2:06:04. That year, he also won the Ljubljana Marathon in Ljubljana, Slovenia with a time of 2:08:33.

In 2019, he won the Hangzhou International Marathon in Hangzhou, China with a time of 2:10:05 which was also a new course record. He became the first Bahraini winner of the event.

In 2023 Marius Kimutai won the Barcelona Marathon with 02:05:06

Achievements

References

External links 

 

Living people
1992 births
Place of birth missing (living people)
Bahraini male marathon runners
Bahraini male long-distance runners